Joanna Ruth "Jo" Place (born 21 June 1962) is a British executive who has served as the chief operating officer of the Bank of England since July 2017.

Early life and education 
Place was born on 21 June 1962 in Derby, England. She attended a state school, where she studied double maths and economics at A-Level. She studied economics from Fitzwilliam College, Cambridge, graduating with a Bachelor of Arts (BA) degree. She has chosen Fitzwilliam College because, at that time, it was one of only two colleges of the University of Cambridge to not require an entrance exam in addition to A-Levels. After completing her BA, Place studied for a postgraduate certificate in education (PGCE) in maths and PE at Homerton College, Cambridge.

Career 
Place taught maths for two years before joining the graduate programme at the Bank of England. She has worked at the Bank for over 30 years, with previous roles including Executive Director of Human Resources (2014 to 2017), Head of Customer Banking Division (playing a key role in the financial crisis), Head of Monetary and Financial Statistics Division; and Director of Regulatory Operations, Prudential Regulation Authority. Place also had a secondment to the Border Agency (2004–2007). Place was appointed chief operating officer at the Bank of England on 27 July 2017. In this post, she has responsibility for the day-to-day operations of the Bank of England.

Since April 2020 Place has been a board member of Persimmon PLC.

References

 

 
 

1962 births
Living people
People associated with the Bank of England
Alumni of Fitzwilliam College, Cambridge
Alumni of Homerton College, Cambridge